Richard Jackson ( – 23 October 1789) was an Irish politician.

He sat in the House of Commons of Ireland from 1751 to 1789, as one of the two members for the borough of Coleraine.

He was twice elected for another borough — Lisburn in  1776 and Randalstown in 1783  — but in each case was also re-elected for Coleraine, and chose to sit for Coleraine.

References 
 

1729 births
Year of birth unknown
1789 deaths
Irish MPs 1727–1760
Irish MPs 1761–1768
Irish MPs 1769–1776
Irish MPs 1776–1783
Irish MPs 1783–1790
Members of the Parliament of Ireland (pre-1801) for County Antrim constituencies
Members of the Parliament of Ireland (pre-1801) for County Londonderry constituencies